Rozsypne is an urban-type settlement in the Torez Municipality, Horlivka Raion, Donetsk Oblast (province) of eastern Ukraine. Population:

Demographics
Native language as of the Ukrainian Census of 2001:
 Ukrainian 19.08%
 Russian 80.25%
 Belarusian 0.22%
 Armenian and Moldovan (Romanian) 0.02%

References

Urban-type settlements in Horlivka Raion